Jocotán is a town and municipality in the Chiquimula department of Guatemala.

Radio Chortis, a Roman Catholic radio station funded by Belgian and German Catholics, is located in the town. It broadcasts primarily in Spanish, but there are a few hours a week in the Ch'orti' language, which is still spoken in some isolated areas.

History

2001 famine

On 3 August 2001, Jocotán municipality declared yellow code in the area when it learned about the desperate situation that the rural communities were facing, facing imminent famine; the root cause of the crisis were the short raining season, and the decline in the international coffee price. Alfonso Portillo's government decreed State of Calamity to get international help; officially, 48 deceased were reported, but there were rumors of hundreds of casualties.

Climate 
Jocotán has a tropical savanna climate (Köppen: Aw).

Geographic location

Jocotán is surrounded by Chiquimula Department municipalities, except at North, where it borders Zacapa:

See also
 
 
 List of places in Guatemala

Notes and references

References

Bibliography

External links 

 
 Página del Municipio de Jocotán: 

Municipalities of the Chiquimula Department